Izadkhvast Rural District is a rural district (dehestan) in the Central District of Abadeh County, Fars Province, Iran. At the 2006 census, its population was not reported.  The rural district has 1 village.

References 

Rural Districts of Fars Province
Abadeh County